Célestin Manasoa is a Malagasy politician.  He was member of the National Assembly of Madagascar as a member of the Tiako I Madagasikara party, he represented the constituency of Ambovombe. He was also mayor of Ambazoa.

References

Year of birth missing (living people)
Living people
Members of the National Assembly (Madagascar)
Tiako I Madagasikara politicians